Castleblayney Faughs are a Gaelic Athletic Association gaelic football and hurling team from Castleblayney, County Monaghan in Ireland. They founded in November 1905 and participate in Monaghan competitions, and most notably in the Monaghan Senior Football Championship. The club holds the record for winning the most senior championship titles in Monaghan.

Notable players
 Eugene "Nudie" Hughes
 Dermot Malone
 Eamon McEneaney
 Stefan White

Honours
 Monaghan Senior Football Championship: 37
1907, 1916, 1917, 1924, 1926, 1931, 1932, 1933, 1936, 1937, 1939, 1940, 1941, 1946, 1963, 1964, 1965, 1966, 1967, 1970, 1971, 1972, 1973, 1975, 1976, 1982, 1986, 1988, 1990, 1991, 1995, 1996, 1998, 1999, 2000, 2001, 2003
 Ulster Senior Club Football Championship: 3
1917, 1986, 1991
 Monaghan Senior Hurling Championship: 32
1943, 1955, 1957, 1958, 1959, 1962, 1974, 1977, 1979, 1988, 1989, 1992, 1994, 1999, 2000, 2001, 2002, 2004, 2005, 2006, 2007, 2008, 2009, 2011, 2012, 2014, 2015, 2017, 2018, 2019,  2020 2021
 Ulster Junior Club Hurling Championship: 3
2005, 2014, 2018
 All-Ireland Junior Club Hurling Championship:
Runners-up 2020
 Monaghan Senior Football League: 15
1931, 1938, 1939, 1941, 1948, 1960, 1961, 1962, 1971, 1974, 1994, 1995, 1996, 2000, 2001
 Monaghan Senior Football League (Div 2): 2
1938, 1961
 Monaghan Junior Football Championship: 1
 1918
 Monaghan Junior Football League: 1
 1953
 Monaghan Reserve Football Championship: 12
 1972, 1974, 1977, 1979, 1996, 1997, 1998, 1999, 2009, 2010, 2011, 2012
 Monaghan Reserve Football League: 12
1960, 1964, 1965, 1967, 1971, 1973, 1975, 1981, 1994, 1995, 1996, 2010
 Monaghan Under 21 (Div 1) Football Championship: 11
 1976, 1978, 1987, 1988, 1989, 1992, 1993, 1995, 2008
 Monaghan Under 21 (Div 2) Football Championship: 1
 1991

References

External links
Official Castleblaney Faughs GAA Club website

Faughs
Gaelic football clubs in County Monaghan
Hurling clubs in County Monaghan
Gaelic games clubs in County Monaghan